Franck Renou (born 19 November 1973) is a retired French football defender.

References

1973 births
Living people
French footballers
FC Nantes players
Lille OSC players
FC Sion players
Stade Brestois 29 players
Association football defenders
Ligue 1 players
Ligue 2 players
Swiss Super League players
French expatriate footballers
Expatriate footballers in Switzerland
French expatriate sportspeople in Switzerland